Kendall Lamar Gray (born May 5, 1992) is an American-born Rwandan basketball player who currently plays for the Bangui Sporting Club. He played college basketball for Delaware State University, being named the 2014–15 Mid-Eastern Athletic Conference Player of the Year, becoming the fourth selection in school history to earn the honor.

Early life
Gray was born in Merced, California but grew up in Dover, Delaware. He earned three varsity letters while playing at Polytech High School in Woodside, Delaware. In 2010, he led the team to a Henlopen Conference Southern Division Championship. In Gray's his senior season he averaged 15 points, 12 rebounds, and 11 blocks per game. He then committed to play for the Delaware State Hornets in college.

College career
Although limited to just 17 games his freshman season, Gray still earned two Mid-Eastern Athletic Conference (MEAC) Defensive Player of the Week awards. He was ninth in NCAA Division I in blocks (54) when he went down with an injury. He remained healthy for the final three seasons of his collegiate career and improved statistically in each successive year. As a junior in 2013–14 he averaged 11.5 points, 7.9 rebounds, and 2.7 blocks per game en route to a Second Team All-MEAC selection. In 2014–15, Gray increased those averages to 12.3, 12.4, and 2.8, respectively. On March 5, 2015, Gray recorded a 33-point, 30-rebound game against Coppin State. It was the most rebounds in a single game at the Division I level in 10 years, and he became just the seventh player in the last 40 seasons with at least 30 rebounds in a game. The next day, the Mid-Eastern Athletic Conference named Gray their Player of the Year and Defensive Player of the Year. He joined Kyle O'Quinn as the only two players in conference history to earn both awards in the same season.

Professional career
After going undrafted in the 2015 NBA draft, Gray signed with Medi Bayreuth of the Basketball Bundesliga on July 23, 2015. On January 18, 2016, he parted ways with Medi Bayreuth. On March 31, he was acquired by the Iowa Energy of the NBA Development League but didn't play for them.

On August 23, 2016, Gray signed with MKS Dąbrowa Górnicza of the Polish League.

On June 6, 2018, Gray signed with Soles de Santo Domingo Este of the Dominican League. Gray rejoined the Long Island Nets for the 2018–19 season.

On September 16, 2019, he signed with Gießen 46ers of the Basketball Bundesliga. Gray averaged 3.3 points and 1.9 rebounds per game. On October 11, 2021, he signed with  JS Kairouan of the Championnat National A.

In August 2022, Gray joined Patriots BBC on a short-term contract to play in the playoffs of the Rwanda Basketball League (RBL). He was selected to play in the RBL All-Star Game.

In November 2022, Gray played for the Bangui Sporting Club in the Elite 16 of the 2023 Road to BAL games.

National team career 
Gray joined the Rwanda national basketball team in 2022.

See also
 List of NCAA Division I men's basketball players with 30 or more rebounds in a game

References

External links
Delaware State Hornets bio
College statistics @ sports-reference.com

1992 births
Living people
American expatriate basketball people in the Dominican Republic
American expatriate basketball people in Germany
American expatriate basketball people in Poland
American men's basketball players
Basketball players from Delaware
Centers (basketball)
Delaware State Hornets men's basketball players
Giessen 46ers players
JS Kairouan basketball players
Long Island Nets players
Medi Bayreuth players
MKS Dąbrowa Górnicza (basketball) players
Patriots BBC players
People from Dover, Delaware
People from Merced, California
Rwandan men's basketball players
Bangui Sporting Club players